Romuald Kujawa (born 17 January 1962) is a Polish footballer. He played in one match for the Poland national football team in 1991.

References

External links
 

1962 births
Living people
Polish footballers
Poland international footballers
Place of birth missing (living people)
Association footballers not categorized by position